Acosmia is a genus of Chengjiang biota priapulid (marine worm) in the family Acosmiidae. It is represented by a single rare species, Acosmia maotiania.

References

Prehistoric protostome genera
Priapulida